Coleophora mosasaurus is a moth of the family Coleophoridae. It is found in the Chinese provinces of Shaanxi and Qinghai and in Turkmenistan.

The larvae feed on Lycium species, including Lycium kopetdaghi and Lycium barbarum. They feed on the leaves of their host plant.

References

mosasaurus
Moths described in 1988
Moths of Asia